Arcology, a portmanteau of "architecture" and "ecology", is a field of creating architectural design principles for very densely populated and ecologically low-impact human habitats.

The term was coined in 1969 by architect Paolo Soleri, who believed that a completed arcology would provide space for a variety of residential, commercial, and agricultural facilities while minimizing individual human environmental impact. These structures have been largely hypothetical, as no arcology, even one envisioned by Soleri himself, has yet been built.

The concept has been popularized by various science fiction writers. Larry Niven and Jerry Pournelle provided a detailed description of an arcology in their 1981 novel Oath of Fealty. William Gibson mainstreamed the term in his seminal 1984 cyberpunk novel Neuromancer, where each corporation has its own self-contained city known as arcologies. More recently, authors such as Peter Hamilton in Neutronium Alchemist and Paolo Bacigalupi in The Water Knife explicitly used arcologies as part of their scenarios. They are often portrayed as self-contained or economically self-sufficient.

Development
An arcology is distinguished from a merely large building in that it is designed to lessen the impact of human habitation on any given ecosystem. It could be self-sustainable, employing all or most of its own available resources for a comfortable life: power, climate control, food production, air and water conservation and purification, sewage treatment, etc. An arcology is designed to make it possible to supply those items for a large population. An arcology would supply and maintain its own municipal or urban infrastructures in order to operate and connect with other urban environments apart from its own.

Arcology was proposed to reduce human impact on natural resources. Arcology designs might apply conventional building and civil engineering techniques in very large, but practical projects in order to achieve pedestrian economies of scale that have proven, post-automobile, to be difficult to achieve in other ways.

Frank Lloyd Wright proposed an early version called Broadacre City although, in contrast to an arcology, his idea is comparatively two-dimensional and depends on a road network. Wright's plan described transportation, agriculture, and commerce systems that would support an economy. Critics said that Wright's solution failed to account for population growth, and assumed a more rigid democracy than the US actually has.

Buckminster Fuller proposed the Old Man River's City project, a domed city with a capacity of 125,000, as a solution to the housing problems in East St. Louis, Illinois.

Paolo Soleri proposed later solutions, and coined the term "arcology". Soleri describes ways of compacting city structures in three dimensions to combat two-dimensional urban sprawl, to economize on transportation and other energy uses. Like Wright, Soleri proposed changes in transportation, agriculture, and commerce. Soleri explored reductions in resource consumption and duplication, land reclamation; he also proposed to eliminate most private transportation. He advocated for greater "frugality" and favored greater use of shared social resources, including public transit (and public libraries).

Similar real-world projects

Arcosanti is an experimental "arcology prototype", a demonstration project under construction in central Arizona since 1970. Designed by Paolo Soleri, its primary purpose is to demonstrate Soleri's personal designs, his application of principles of arcology to create a pedestrian-friendly urban form.

Many cities in the world have proposed projects adhering to the design principles of the arcology concept, like Tokyo, and Dongtan near Shanghai. The Dongtan project may have collapsed, and it failed to open for the Shanghai World Expo in 2010.

McMurdo Station of the United States Antarctic Program and other scientific research stations on Antarctica resemble the popular conception of an arcology as a technologically advanced, relatively self-sufficient human community. The Antarctic research base provides living and entertainment amenities for roughly 3,000 staff who visit each year. Its remoteness and the measures needed to protect its population from the harsh environment give it an insular character. Under international treaty, it must avoid damage to the surrounding ecosystem.

Begich Towers operates like a small-scale arcology encompassing nearly all of the population of Whittier, Alaska. The building contains residential housing as well as a police station, grocery, and municipal offices.
Whittier once boasted a second structure known as the Buckner Building. The Buckner Building still stands but was deemed unfit for habitation after the 1969 earthquake.

The Line is planned to be the first development in Neom, a $500 billion project. The city's plans anticipate a population of 9 million. Excavation work had started along the entire length of the project by October 2022.

In popular culture
Most proposals to build real arcologies have failed due to financial, structural or conceptual shortcomings. Arcologies are therefore found primarily in fictional works.

 In Robert Silverberg's The World Inside, most of the global population of 75 billion live inside giant skyscrapers, called "urbmons", each of which contains hundreds of thousands of people. The urbmons are arranged in "constellations". Each urbmon is divided into "neighborhoods" of 40 or so floors. All the needs of the inhabitants are provided inside the building – food is grown outside and brought into the building – so the idea of going outside is heretical and can be a sign of madness. The book examines human life when the population density is extremely high.
 Another significant example is the 1981 novel Oath of Fealty by Larry Niven and Jerry Pournelle, in which a segment of the population of Los Angeles has moved into an arcology. The plot examines the social changes that result, both inside and outside the arcology. Thus the arcology is not just a plot device but a subject of critique.
 In the city-building video game Sim City 2000, self-contained arcologies can be built, reducing the infrastructure needs of the city.

See also

 Autonomous building
 Bionic architecture
 Earthship
 Megastructure
 Proposed tall buildings and structures
 Shimizu Mega-City Pyramid
 Underground city
 Urban ecology
 Vertical farming

References
Notes

Further reading
 Soleri, Paolo. Arcology: The City in the Image of Man. 1969: Cambridge, Massachusetts, MIT Press.

External links

 Arcology: The City in the Image of Man by Paolo Soleri (full text online)
 Arcology.com – useful links
 The Night Land by William Hope Hodgson (full text online)
 Victory City
 A discussion of arcology concepts

Usage of "arcology" vs. "hyperstructure"
 Arcology.com ("An arcology in southern China" on front page)
 Arcology ("An arcology is a self-contained environment...")
 SculptorsWiki: Arcology ("The only arcology yet on Earth...")
 Review of Shadowrun: Renraku Arcology ("What's an arcology? A self-contained, largely self-sufficient living, working, recreational structure...")

Megastructures
Exploratory engineering
Environmental design
Human habitats
Planned cities
Urban studies and planning terminology
Emerging technologies
Cyberpunk themes
Architecture related to utopias